Abadon is the ring name of an American professional wrestler currently signed to All Elite Wrestling.

Professional wrestling career 
Trained by the Rocky Mountain Pro Academy, they made their professional wrestling debut on January 18, 2019, at a Respect Women's Wrestling event, defeating Aria Aurora. They were a regular at Rocky Mountain Pro (RMP), winning the Rocky Mountain Pro Lockettes Championship on two occasions.

Abadon made their debut in All Elite Wrestling on AEW Dark on March 4, 2020, where they wrestled Hikaru Shida. They made their Dynamite debut on June 17, defeating Anna Jay. After the match, Abadon signed a full time contract. On October 22 they suffered a throat injury during a match with Tay Conti which kept them out of action for a month. On November 25 episode of Dynamite, Abadon returned to All Elite Wrestling, confronting Hikaru Shida, causing Shida to recoil in fear and drop the AEW Women's World Championship. The feud continued for several weeks and would conclude on January 7, 2021, at AEW New Years Smash, where Abadon lost a match against Shida for the AEW Women's World Championship. They have continued to wrestle in AEW and other promotions to the present.

Personal life 
Abadon is non-binary and uses they/them pronouns.

Championships and accomplishments 

 Rocky Mountain Pro
 RMP Lockettes Championship (2 times)

References

External links 

 
 
 

1992 births
21st-century professional wrestlers
All Elite Wrestling personnel
American non-binary professional wrestlers
LGBT professional wrestlers
Living people
People from Denver
Professional wrestlers from Colorado